Emil Kellenberger (3 April 1864 in Walzenhausen, Switzerland – 20 November 1943 in Walzenhausen) was a Swiss sport shooter who competed in the early 20th century in rifle shooting. He participated in Shooting at the 1900 Summer Olympics in Paris and won three Olympic medals, two gold medals in the Military Rifle 3 positions and team categories and a silver medal in the Military Rifle (kneeling). However his silver medal was tied with the Danish shooter Anders Peter Nielsen.

References

External links

1864 births
1943 deaths
Swiss male sport shooters
ISSF rifle shooters
Olympic gold medalists for Switzerland
Olympic silver medalists for Switzerland
Olympic shooters of Switzerland
Shooters at the 1900 Summer Olympics
Olympic medalists in shooting
Medalists at the 1900 Summer Olympics
People from Appenzell Ausserrhoden